Antrorbis breweri, common name Manitou cavesnail, is a species of freshwater snail with gills and an operculum, an aquatic gastropod mollusk in the family Lithoglyphidae.

Antrorbis breweri is the only species in the genus Antrorbis. The generic name Antrorbis is derived from Classical Greek language word "antrum", that means a cave and from Greek language word "orbis", that means circle.

The specific name breweri is in honor of Dr. Stephen Brewer, the owner of Manitou Cave.

Distribution
This species is endemic to the United States and it is known only from its type locality. The type locality is Manitou Cave, Little Wills Valley, Coosa River Basin, Fort Payne, Alabama.

Description
The shape of the shell is discoidal. The shell has 2.5-3.0 whorls.

The width of the shell is 1.53-1.79 mm. The height of the shell is 0.80-0.98 mm.

The length of the whole animal is 2.7-3.0 mm.

Ecology
Antrorbis breweri lives in cool stream in Manitou Cave. It is threatened by habitat loss.

References

External links 
 Species profile of Unnamed snail (Antrorbis breweri) at U.S. Fish & Wildlife Service webpage

Lithoglyphidae
Taxonomy articles created by Polbot
Taxobox binomials not recognized by IUCN